Oskar Wacker (October 20, 1898 – August 26, 1972) was a German politician of the Christian Democratic Union (CDU) and former member of the German Bundestag.

Life 
In 1946, he was a member of the constituent state assembly in Württemberg-Baden and was subsequently a member of the state parliament until 1950. He was a member of the German Bundestag from its first election in 1949 to 1957. In parliament he represented the constituency of Tauberbischofsheim.

Literature

References

1898 births
1972 deaths
Members of the Bundestag for Baden-Württemberg
Members of the Bundestag 1953–1957
Members of the Bundestag 1949–1953
Members of the Bundestag for the Christian Democratic Union of Germany
Members of the Landtag of Württemberg